Alampur Saibaba Goud is an Indian ophthalmologist and founder-chairman of the Devnar Foundation for the Blind. He is also a social entrepreneur, and active in the voluntary organization at Secunderabad in Andhra Pradesh, a state of India. He works in the field of providing aid to visually challenged and visually disabled children in India.

He had won awards for his work and has written several books and articles for the blind in  English and Telugu newspapers and journals. He does educational radio talks broadcast on the Doordarshan network in India.

Professional life
Goud is president of the National Society for the Prevention of Blindness (NSPB) in the state of Andhra Pradesh, and Professor and Head of the Department of Ophthalmology at Osmania Medical College at Hyderabad. He is the Founder-trustee of Devnar Foundation for the Blind and chairman of the Andhra Pradesh Cricket Association for the Blind.

Activist for the blind community of Andhra Pradesh
Goud leads the Devnar Foundation (founded in 1991) in their efforts to provide opportunities and infrastructure essential to integrating the visually impaired into society as productive adults. Through the foundation, vision-disabled people are provided accommodation, schools, and vocational programs to become self-employed or work in the private sector. The foundation provides computer training and facilities for extracurricular activities such as cricket, chess, music and dance.

The foundation is attempting to organise a Polytechnic engineering college for the blind through various affiliations. It provides medical care for sight-related needs of children along with parental counseling and genetic counseling. The Foundation manages the Ramananda Centre for Advanced Learning and Research for visually impaired vocational training and provides CBR programs, and operates Braille printing presses.

Success stories
Companies that have supported the efforts of Foundation include GE, Dell, and Oracle Corporation. The employees of GE hold entertainment and story telling programs which help the children feel that they are a part of normal society. Some of these companies have volunteered to recruit students once they graduate. The Government of India provides a 1% reservation for the blind.

Awards
Padma Shri in Medicine
He is the first ever recipient of the Indian ophthalmologic award - the national award Ph.D. given by Osmania University
Dr K. R. Dutta award for exemplary work in the field of Ophthalmology community
Drishti Pradatha Award
Rastriya Gaurav Award
J. S. Mahashadba Award by the All Indian Ophthalmological Society.
Award for a film on glaucoma by the All Indian Ophthalmologoical Society
E. V. Srinivasan Award

Author
Goud is the author of several books.
Nayanabhiramam in Telugu
Meeru-Mee Kanulu in Telugu for neo-literates for eye care.
The Organ of the Sight in English

References

External links
http://www.devnarfoundationfortheblind.org
https://web.archive.org/web/20080316082310/http://www.developednation.org/interviews/asaibabagoud.htm
http://www.isb.edu/ils2007/track2_profiles.html 

http://www.newindpress.com/NewsItems.asp?ID=IEU20070802020209&Page=U&Title=Hyderabad&Topic=0&
http://www.indiaedunews.net/Engineering/Engineering_college_for_blind_students_1741/print.asp
https://web.archive.org/web/20080905164347/http://www.aios.org/awards2007.htm
https://web.archive.org/web/20090130213809/http://ndtv.com/convergence/ndtv/story.aspx?id=NEWEN20090081403

Living people
Telugu people
Recipients of the Padma Shri in medicine
Indian ophthalmologists
Medical doctors from Hyderabad, India
People from Secunderabad
20th-century Indian medical doctors
Indian medical writers
Year of birth missing (living people)
20th-century surgeons